This list of tallest buildings in Cape Town ranks completed buildings by height in the South African city of Cape Town, Western Cape, the second-largest city in South Africa. Cape Town's tallest building is the Portside Tower, which stands at 139 m (456 ft); the tower was built in 2014 and was the first significant tall building erected in the central business district in 21 years. Adjacent to Portside the 16 on Bree building, standing at 118 m (387 ft) tall, is the city's second notable tall building in the financial district having been completed in 2021 along with the 35 Lower Long tower and the Halyard with a further new tower, The Rubik, under construction.

Tallest buildings
This includes spires and architectural details, but does not include antenna masts.

Diagram of the tallest buildings 
There are only nine buildings in Cape Town above a height of 100 m:

Timeline of tallest buildings
The Mutual Building was the tallest building in Cape Town for 23 years, before it was overtaken by the Sanlam Centre (Naspers Centre) in 1962. After it was completed in 1972 and overtook the Trust Bank Centre (ABSA Centre) which is now called (The Foreshore Place) after being turned into a residential building, 1 Thibault Square (BP Centre) was the tallest building in the city for the next 42 years before Portside Tower was opened.
Before the completion of the Portside Tower, the 26-floor Safmarine Tower (Triangle House) was the last skyscraper to open its doors in the Mother City on completion in 1993. After the construction of the Portside Tower confidence in the construction of skyscrapers in Cape Town grew stronger and this saw the construction of a 118m (387ft) skyscraper called the 16on Bree. It is the tallest residential building in Cape Town.

Under construction or proposed

References

Tallest, Cape Town
Buildings and structures in Cape Town